The People's Party of the Russian Federation (Narodnaya partiya Rossiyskoy Federatsii, NPRF) was a centrist political party in Russia. The leader of the party was Gennady Raikov.

Before official registration of the People's Party on 29 September 2001, the "People's Deputy" group existed in 3rd State Duma. It included 58 deputies. Most of them later became members of the People's Party of the Russian Federation. The "People's Deputy" consisted of independent members of the State Duma elected exclusively in single-mandate constituencies. The faction supported the initiatives of the new President of Russia Vladimir Putin.

At the 2003 parliamentary election which saw the election of the fourth convocation of the State Duma, the party had won 1.2% of the popular vote and 16 out of 450 seats. Most deputies were elected in single mandate districts and later joined United Russia faction.

The People's Party joined A Just Russia on 14 April 2007.

References

External links
Official web site

Defunct political parties in Russia
Political parties established in 2000
Political parties disestablished in 2007
2000 establishments in Russia
2007 disestablishments in Russia